Phoberus braacki is a species of hide beetle in the subfamily Troginae.

References

braacki
Beetles described in 1980